This is a list of films which have placed number one at the weekly box office in Turkey during 2011. The weeks start on Fridays, and finish on Thursdays. The box-office number one is established in terms of tickets sold during the week.

Box office number-one films

Highest-grossing films

In-Year Release

References

2011 in Turkey
Turkey
2011
2011 in Turkish cinema